Det gamle guld is a 1951 Danish family film directed by Jon Iversen and Alice O'Fredericks.

Cast
 Poul Reichhardt - Niels Sværke
 Tove Maës - Grethe Holm
 Maria Garland - Martha Sværke
 Per Buckhøj - Hans Sværke
 Ib Schønberg - Sognefoged Dines Mikkelsen
 Peter Malberg - Jens
 Erika Voigt - Jacobine
 Louis Miehe-Renard - Palle
 Birgitte Reimer - Klara Karius
 Sigurd Langberg - Propritær Karius
 Jørn Jeppesen - Hugo David
 Pia Ahnfelt-Rønne - Maria - pige på Dybegården
 Paul Holck-Hofmann - Bankdirektør
 Christen Møller - Arkæolog
 Agnes Phister-Andresen - Maren - nabokone
 Jørgen Henriksen - Niels som dreng
 Grethe Holmer
 Morten Korch - Himself
 Aksel Schiøtz - Singer (voice)

External links

1951 films
1950s Danish-language films
Danish black-and-white films
Films directed by Alice O'Fredericks
Films directed by Jon Iversen
Films scored by Sven Gyldmark